The Mineral Fork Formation is a mapped Proterozoic bedrock unit in Utah.

Description
Granger et al. (1952) describe the Mineral Fork Formation as black tillite consisting of boulders, cobbles and pebbles of quartzite, limestone, or granitic rocks in a black sandy matrix, with dark-gray to black varved slate or shale, dark-gray quartzite, and occasional channel fillings of boulder conglomerate.

Exposures
According to Yonkee et al. (2000), the Mineral Fork is exposed at the following locations in Utah: 
Antelope Island
Big Cottonwood Canyon
Santaquin-Provo

And also:
Little Cottonwood Canyon

Fossils
Abundant microfossils of planktonic alga of Bavlinella faveolata.

Age
The presence of Bavlinella faveolata in the formation indicates a likely age of 750–650 Ma, because this fossil occurs elsewhere where it is well-dated radiometrically. The Mineral Fork Formation is no older than 1,250 Ma and no younger than 540 Ma. Thus it is likely Neoproterozoic but possibly Mesoproterozoic.

References

Geologic formations of Utah
Wasatch Range